Ronald D. Herrell (born December 1, 1948) was a Democratic member of the Indiana House of Representatives, representing the 30th District from 2006 through 2010. He previously served from 1998 through 2004.

References

External links
Indiana State Legislature - Representative Ron Herrell Official government website
Project Vote Smart - Representative Ron Herrell (IN) profile
Follow the Money - Ron Herrell
2008 2006 2004 2002 2000 1998 1996 1994 campaign contributions

Democratic Party members of the Indiana House of Representatives
1948 births
Living people
People from Kokomo, Indiana
People from Rochester, Indiana